Simo Mälkiä (born August 21, 1983 in Lappeenranta, Finland) is a Finnish former ice hockey defenceman. He played in the Finnish SM-liiga for SaiPa and Jokerit.  He retired on February 20, 2012 due to injury.

His father Heikki Mälkiä also played professional hockey, spending much of his career with Saipa and is currently head coach of HDD Olimpija Ljubljana in the Austrian Hockey League.

References

 http://www.jokerit.com/index.php?id=2&pid=82 (in Finnish)

1983 births
Living people
Jokerit players
KooKoo players
Mikkelin Jukurit players
SaiPa players
Finnish ice hockey defencemen
People from Lappeenranta
Sportspeople from South Karelia